Our Place may refer to:

 Our Place (Australian TV series), a 2005 variety television show
 Our Place (U.S. TV series), a 1967 variety television show
 Our Place, an album by Adi Dick
 Our Place (organization) Jewish teen anti-substance abuse organization in the United States
 Our Place (film), 2017 film
 Our Place (restaurant), 2017 launch

See also 
 Our House (disambiguation)